Aimee Teegarden (born October 10, 1989) is an American actress, model, and producer. She starred as Julie Taylor in the NBC drama Friday Night Lights (2006–2011). In 2014, Teegarden starred as Emery Whitehill in The CW's short-lived science fiction romantic drama Star-Crossed.

Early life
Teegarden was born and raised in Downey, California, a suburb of Los Angeles. She graduated from high school through independent study at the age of sixteen.

Career

Teegarden has modeled for campaigns including Alltel, Hollister, Old Navy, Tommy Hilfiger, and YMI Jeans. She has made several television appearances including Cold Case, Ned's Declassified School Survival Guide, and Disney Channel's Hannah Montana.

Teegarden joined the cast of the NBC drama Friday Night Lights, opposite Kyle Chandler and Connie Britton, as Julie Taylor, the elder daughter of Eric Taylor (Chandler), a high school head football coach, and Tami Taylor (Britton), a high school guidance counselor. The show ran for five seasons from October 3, 2006 to February 9, 2011.

On August 24, 2007, during the Miss Teen USA 2007 pageant, Teegarden posed the question ("Recent polls have shown a fifth of Americans can't locate the U.S. on a world map. Why do you think this is?") that led to an infamous reply by contestant Caitlin Upton. 
 
In 2009, Teegarden guest-starred in three episodes of The CW's 90210 as Rhonda, a West Beverly student who crosses paths with Ethan Ward. During the time, Teegarden guest-starred on Legend of the Seeker, portraying a teenage girl who just found out she was a confessor, and later appeared in episodes of CSI: Miami and CSI: Crime Scene Investigation.

In 2010, it was reported she had been cast to star as Amanda Miles in the Warner Premiere and Dolphin Entertainment action web series, Aim High with Jackson Rathbone.
The show discusses Facebook being the first "social series" ever created and premiered on October 18, 2011. The web series returned for the second season on December 9, 2013 on Crackle.
 
In 2011, Teegarden co-starred in Wes Craven's Scream 4 as horror loving high schooler, Jenny Randall featuring in the opening scene. Also in 2011, Teegarden starred opposite Thomas McDonell in the Disney film Prom as Nova Prescott, an overachieving high school senior, bound for Georgetown University after graduation, trying to put together the prom while dealing with love, heartbreak, and pressure from her parents, and falling in love with the school bad boy Jesse Richter (McDonnell). In May 2011, she was named "TV Actress of the Year" by Young Hollywood Awards for her work on Friday Night Lights. In June 2011, she signed on to co-star in the war drama Love and Honor, with Liam Hemsworth and Teresa Palmer. Teegarden also played Abby in Beneath the Darkness.

In February 2012, Teegarden was cast as America Singer in The CW pilot The Selection. However, the pilot was not picked up to air in the fall. It was reworked and expected to be picked up for a midseason replacement or the following season and the second pilot was filmed, but it was also passed by the network.

In 2014, Teegarden starred as Emery Whitehill in The CW science fiction romantic drama Star-Crossed which ran for one season. In 2017, she co-starred in F. Javier Gutiérrez's horror film Rings.

Personal life
Teegarden is a vegan. She was a member of Job's Daughters International and is a Past Honored Queen of Bethel No. 244 in Downey, California. In 2008 she was awarded "Honorary International Sweetheart of DeMolay International", a young men's group associated with Job's Daughters. She supports Oceana, a non-profit ocean advocacy group.

Filmography

Film

Television

Music videos

Awards and nominations

References

External links

1989 births
21st-century American actresses
Actresses from Los Angeles
American child actresses
American film actresses
American child models
Female models from California
American television actresses
Living people
People from Downey, California